Shi Yugang (born July 1965) is a Chinese politician of Miao ethnicity who is the current deputy party secretary of Yunnan, in office since November 2021.

He was a representative of the 19th National Congress of the Chinese Communist Party and is a representative of the 20th National Congress of the Chinese Communist Party. He is an alternate member of the 20th Central Committee of the Chinese Communist Party.

Biography
Shi was born in Fenghuang County, Hunan, in July 1965. In 1982, he entered the Minzu University of China, where he majored in Chinese history. He joined the Chinese Communist Party (CCP) in June 1996.

After graduating in 1989, Shi was assigned to the State Ethnic Affairs Commission, where he eventually becoming deputy director in 2017.

In September 2018, Shi was transferred to northeast China's Jilin province and appointed vice governor. A year later, he was appointed head of Publicity Department and was admitted to member of the Standing Committee of the CCP Jilin Provincial Committee, the province's top authority.

He was made deputy party secretary of Yunnan in November 2021, in addition to serving as president of the Party School.

References

1965 births
Living people
People from Fenghuang County
Minzu University of China alumni
Miao people
People's Republic of China politicians from Hunan
Chinese Communist Party politicians from Hunan
Alternate members of the 20th Central Committee of the Chinese Communist Party